John Henry Clanfergael Buckler (1 April 1906 – 30 October 1936) was a British actor. He was the son of the actor Hugh Buckler and his wife, actress Violet Paget, about whom little is known.

Biography

As a child, Buckler spent some years in England, before joining his parents in Australia in 1914.

Buckler made his Broadway debut in 1925 as an English Reporter in The Green Hat that was based on the novel by Michael Arlen. He entered Hollywood films in 1934 and appeared in two MGM films David Copperfield (1935) and Tarzan Escapes as Captain Fry (1936).

Buckler and his father were driving together in a heavy rain storm when their car skidded off the road into Malibou Lake, California. Both men died.

Filmography

References

External links

1906 births
1936 deaths
English male film actors
People from Cape Town
20th-century English male actors
British expatriate male actors in the United States
Road incident deaths in California